Avery Rock Light was a lighthouse in Avery Rock, Machias Bay, Maine, United States. It was built on a rocky islet, 110 metres long and 48 metres wide, in the middle of Machias Bay accessible only by boat. The old light was a square tower built in 1875 with a gallery and lantern centered on the keeper's house. The lighthouse was automated in 1926, but it later suffered storm damage in 1947 that was beyond repair which led to its demolition.

References

 
 History of Avery Rock Lighthouse on New England Lighthouses: A Virtual Guide

Lighthouses completed in 1875
Lighthouses in Washington County, Maine